Giovanni Maffei may refer to:

Giovanni Camillo Maffei, 16th-century Italian doctor, philosopher and musician
Giovanni Pietro Maffei (1533–1603), Italian Jesuit and author